L-selectride is an organoborane. It is used in organic chemistry as a reducing agent, for example in the reduction of a ketone, as part of Overman's synthesis of strychnine.

Under certain conditions, L-selectride can selectively reduce enones by conjugate addition of hydride, owing to the greater steric hindrance the bulky hydride reagent experiences at the carbonyl carbon relative to the (also-electrophilic) β-position.  L-Selectride can also stereoselectively reduce carbonyl groups in a 1,2-fashion, again due to the steric nature of the hydride reagent.

N-selectride and K-selectride are related compounds, but instead of lithium as cation they have sodium and potassium cations respectively. These reagents can sometimes be used as alternatives to, for instance, sodium amalgam reductions in inorganic chemistry.

Aprepitant is another synthesis example where L-selectride was used.

References 

Borohydrides
Lithium compounds
Organoboranes
Organolithium compounds
Reducing agents